Charles Cholmondeley  was a British intelligence officer known for his leading role in Operation Mincemeat, a critical military deception operation which misdirected German forces' attention away from the Allied Invasion of Sicily in Operation Husky.

Biography
Cholmondeley, who was born in O'Halloran Hill, South Australia, was a flight lieutenant in the Royal Air Force (RAF) who had been seconded to MI5, Britain's domestic counter-intelligence and security service. He had been appointed as the secretary of the Twenty Committee, a small inter-service, inter-departmental intelligence team in charge of double agents. 

In November 1942, the Twenty Committee turned down Cholmondeley's Operation Mincemeat plan as being unworkable, but thought there may have been some potential in the idea. As there was a naval connection to the plan, Ewen Montagu, the naval representative, was assigned to work with Cholmondeley to develop the plan further. As part of his duties Montagu had been briefed on the need for deception operations to aid the Allied war aims in a forthcoming invasion operation in the Mediterranean. 

He was awarded the MBE in 1944.

Cholmondeley died 15 June 1982; Montagu wrote an obituary that was published in The Times.

In popular culture 
  In the 2021 British war drama Operation Mincemeat, Cholmondeley is played by Matthew Macfadyen.

References

Books 
 
 

Operation Mincemeat
Royal Air Force Volunteer Reserve personnel of World War II
Royal Air Force officers
Officers of the Order of the British Empire
MI5 personnel